Ammaayi Amma is a 1977 Indian Malayalam film, directed by M. Masthan and produced by Harifa Rasheed. The film stars Sukumari, Jayabharathi, Adoor Bhasi and Ashalatha in the lead roles. The film has musical score by A. T. Ummer.

Cast
 
Sukumari 
Jayabharathi 
Adoor Bhasi 
Ashalatha
Pattom Sadan 
Sankaradi 
Sreelatha Namboothiri 
Prathapachandran 
Kanchana 
M. G. Soman 
Meena 
P. K. Venukkuttan Nair
P. R. Varalakshmi
Sreekala (Rathidevi)
Vincent

Soundtrack
The music was composed by A. T. Ummer and the lyrics were written by Anukuttan.

References

External links
 

1977 films
1970s Malayalam-language films